The H class is a class of container ships operated by the Danish shipping company Maersk Line. The ships were built by Hyundai Heavy Industries at their shipyard located in Ulsan, South Korea.

The ship has 21 container bays and can carry a maximum of 21 containers wide on deck. They are not designed with a specific speed and draft in mind and thus can be deployed on both east-west and north-south trade routes.

The first 9 ships were ordered by Maersk in 2015. In 2018 Maersk announced it had ordered 2 additional ships from the same shipbuilder.

2018 Maersk Honam fire 

On 6 March 2018 a large fire broke out in one of the cargo holds of the Maersk Honam. It took more than 3 days to get the fire under control and the ship continued to burn for several more days. Four crew members lost their lives. The ship was salvaged and the damaged parts of the vessel were rebuilt. The ship was renamed Maersk Halifax before entering into service again.

List of ships

References 

Container ship classes
Ships of the Maersk Line
Ships built by Hyundai Heavy Industries Group